The Joanne World Tour was the fifth headlining concert tour by American singer Lady Gaga, in support of her fifth studio album, Joanne (2016). It began on August 1, 2017, in Vancouver, Canada and ended on February 1, 2018, in Birmingham, England. After tickets went on sale, various shows in Europe and North America quickly sold out, prompting additional dates in both continents. The concert series was deemed "more minimalist" in comparison to the singer's previous tours, but received praise for the visuals, Gaga's singing abilities and her connection with the audience.

Due to chronic pain caused by fibromyalgia, Gaga was forced to cancel the last 10 shows of the concert series. The tour ultimately grossed $95 million from 842,000 tickets sold.

Development 

Two weeks before Lady Gaga's fifth studio album, Joanne, was released in October 2016, she began a small promotional tour called the Dive Bar Tour, which visited bars across the US. On October 24, 2016, the singer confirmed to Howard Stern that she would also embark on a worldwide concert tour to continue promoting the record. She clarified that it would begin after her performance at the Super Bowl LI halftime show, that took place on February 5, 2017. Following the halftime show, Gaga announced the Joanne World Tour which began on August 1, 2017, at Vancouver's Rogers Arena and would continue till December 18, 2017, ending at Inglewood, California's The Forum venue, for a total of 60 shows across North and South America and Europe.

On March 2, 2017, Coachella Valley Music and Arts Festival announced Gaga as a main headliner of the festival in Indio after Beyoncé had to cancel her appearance due to pregnancy. Billboard reported that the tour would start with the Coachella performances, four months earlier than originally expected. However, in an interview with Entertainment Weekly, Gaga's choreographer Richard Jackson confirmed that the performances at  Coachella was exclusively for the festival and the Joanne World Tour would be completely different. Nevertheless, elements from the festival performance as well as from the Super Bowl halftime show were kept and used for the tour.

Gaga's participation in the Rock in Rio festival in Brazil was supposed to be the only date in South America. However, due to being hospitalized for body pain, she had to cancel the date. On September 18, 2017, Gaga postponed the European leg of the tour as a result of further chronic pain she endured. The postponed dates were announced a few weeks later to reconvene from January 14, 2018 in Barcelona and end on February 23, 2018 in Germany. However, due to severe pain caused by fibromyalgia, Gaga was forced to cancel the remaining 10 shows of her tour, which consequently ended in Birmingham on February 1, 2018.

Production

Conception 

The Joanne World Tour plans had to be put on hold temporarily for the Coachella rehearsals. However, its concept was in development since the Super Bowl and rehearsals started after Gaga finished filming for A Star Is Born, her first lead role as an actress. By July 2017, Gaga told Billboard magazine that she and her team were discussing the song selection process as well as where all they would want choreography in the show. She confirmed her plans of releasing more music on tour, like standalone single "The Cure", which was released following the first Coachella performance. Gaga had also planned to play another Dive Bar stop at Las Vegas in July 2017 before kicking off the tour. The singer explained that she wanted to have a slowed-down section during the Joanne World Tour, so that she was able to "really connect with each person in the most intimate way that I can, like it would be in a dive bar". She also wanted to honor the victims of the Manchester Arena bombing, which had happened in May 2017, on every show of the tour.

In February  2017, Gaga unveiled a look-book for the tour, which would be available as part of the merchandise on the tour. The book was a collaboration between London-based creative studio Lobster Eye and merchandising company Bravado. They hired photographer Synchrodogs, and stylist Daria Lagenberg to create the photographs. Models like Stacy Koren and Daria Svertilova posed for the pictures, which showed them in a wood-inspired set. Tania Shcheglova and Roman Noven of Synchrodogs explained in an interview with Women's Wear Daily that envisioned a colorful aesthetic for the pictures, being given total freedom as to how they would create it. Wanting to mix both "artificial and natural elements", Synchrodogs used Ukrainian landscape as the backdrops for the photo shoot. The merchandise consisted of necklaces, scarves and T-shirts, with Alexa Tietjen from the Los Angeles Times commenting that "If the lookbook is any indication, the Joanne World Tour just might be Gaga's most fashionable yet." They were made available for purchase at clothing shop Urban Outfitters from May 19, 2017. Consisting of long and short-sleeved T-shirts and bomber jackets, the collection had 10 different items for men and women, with Joanne inspired artwork on them.

Stage 

Gaga confirmed in July 2017 that the stage design was completed and building was in progress. The stage was deemed by her as different than all the previous builds done for her tours. The singer also added that "lighting is a big thing this year" on the tour. The main stage was built in collaboration with Tait Inc. with production manager Robert 'Hydro' Mullin, and creative designer, LeRoy Bennett. It consists of three moving platforms for staging equipment and five performer wave lifts that can move in unison with one another or independently in various different configurations. Carly Mallenbaum from USA Today called them "tetris stages", because of their changing alignments. Altogether they render the different configurations and shapes to the stage: elevated, flat, criss-cross, diagonal or staircase.

When not being used for videos, they descend to connect the main stage with the circular satellite stages and the b-stage, allowing access to the performers to move between them. Through these moving platforms and stage, Gaga was able to traverse the entirety of an arena and perform close to the audience. The satellite stages also consisted of two  hydraulic lifts, which raised the singer to join a platform on the b-stage. Tait also designed a laser lit, heart-shaped piano. It was adorned with 44 laser beams, that lit up the arena and sequenced with the keypads on the piano. The 1.25-inch acrylic shell piano was enhanced by adding a mix of dichroic filmed polycarbonate fascia, thereby reflecting the beams more.

Before the tour had started, Gaga talked about the option of playing new songs during the concert series, saying it is "absolutely" her intention to do so. However, she later added, that because of the stage set, the possibility is less likely. She said that "this show's actually extremely complex and complicated, and the stage is coded with a computer. It's intense and the cues all have to be met at a particular time. It's high stress and tense backstage to make sure everything happens at the exact moment it's supposed to. So, the setlist might change a little bit, but mostly you're coming to see a piece that we've created for you."

Costume design and makeup 

Like on the singer's previous tours, the show was divided into separate segments, each preceded by a costume change of the singer. While Gaga had not shared any sketches or details concerning the costumes before the tour began, it was reported that nearly 50,000 Swarovski crystals had been used while designing the costumes and props for Gaga and the dancers. Sarah Tanno, who worked as makeup artist for the tour, has revealed that the crystals were even used on Gaga's eyes "in order to create a multi-dimensional effect that shines on stage". Gaga shared a photo on Instagram prior to the first show, giving a preview of her two-toned, orange and green wig that she later wore for the shows.

The first outfit worn by her was a black bejewelled fringe leotard with heavy embroidery, completed with a crystallized sequin hat. The ensemble was custom-made for her by Alexander Wang, who was inspired by "Gaga's incredible energy" and "the Western spirit", "as well as her transformation into Joanne". Discussing his creation with Vogue, Wang further added that the outfit was influenced by "a cowboy boot's heavy stitching and embellishments". Gaga later appeared on stage in other "Western-inspired" looks. For one of them, Gaga donned a black jacket with much leather fringe, along with black thigh-high-boots, fishnets, and a black hat. Stripping off the jacket, she was seen in a mesh leather cut-out bodysuit. A different "cowgirl" ensemble consisted of a wide-brim hat and a white, hand-painted fringe blazer, which featured song and album titles from her past discography and lyrics from the track, "Perfect Illusion".

For a performance that involved a new version of Gaga's characteristic "disco-stick" prop from the Super Bowl LI halftime show, she also changed into a long sleeve light blue leather bodysuit with dramatic shoulder pads, scattered pearls, and matching, knee-high boots. Another outfit was a black velvet bodysuit with rose embellished sleeves and custom black velvet block-heel booties designed by Giuseppe Zanotti, which were later completed with a white ball gown skirt. Gaga later dressed up in a bold red Norma Kamali "sleeping bag" puffer coat with a 10-foot-long train and an eye mask. Lauren Alexis Fisher from Harper's Bazaar remarked that Gaga brought back "the avant garde looks she's always embraced" with the outfit. After taking off the coat, Gaga started performing in a red leather bodysuit and tassel leather boots. She also wore a geometric white jacket with multiple bows on both arms, completed with a feathered masquerade mask and a second set of Giuseppe Zanotti heels with a crystal ankle strap. The ensemble has been compared to Gaga's look during The Fame Monster era. She later removed the jacket, revealing a glittering long-sleeve, mock neck leotard underneath. For the encore, Gaga donned a sparkling, crystal-embellished robe coat and the same pink hat as seen on the cover of Joanne.

Concert synopsis 

The show begins with a countdown displayed on a large screen, with the line "Don't call me Gaga" repeatedly played from the speakers. After Gaga shouts out that she instead wants to be called Joanne, she starts performing "Diamond Heart", standing solely on a raised platform with a microphone stand. She then moves on to sing "A-Yo", while playing on a guitar, and her dancers and guitarists also appear on stage. The show then continues with a choreographed performance of "Poker Face" with her dancers clad in black cowboy-style leather costumes. The first act of the show is concluded by "Perfect Illusion", followed by a video interlude that shows Gaga driving a vintage convertible letting out pink smoke. "John Wayne" is performed with pyrotechnic effects alongside her dancers. This is followed by "Scheiße", performed on the raised platforms. After a solo performance of "Alejandro", Gaga leaves the stage for a costume change.

Following another video interlude, depicting the singer with rhino horns, Gaga appears on stage playing her keytar to "Just Dance". "LoveGame" and "Telephone" follows the performance, the former using her characteristic disco-stick. During "Applause", the three lightning pods that were used for video projection are lowered, forming bridges for Gaga and her dancers to cross between the b-stages, allowing them to get to the piano by the end of the song. Here Gaga gives a speech to the crowd and then starts singing "Come to Mama" and "The Edge of Glory" on the piano. Changing into a ball gown Gaga performs "Born This Way" accompanied by colorful lighting effects.

After another video interlude, Gaga returns to sing "Bloody Mary" in a puffer coat red dress, which is changed into a red bodysuit for "Dancin' in Circles". Gaga then performs "Paparazzi" portraying a choreographed battle onstage, showing someone stalked and murdered. Ambulance sirens are heard and a cross with a red and blue background is displayed as one of the pods are lifted, containing her. The show then shifts into "Angel Down" as the pod that contained Gaga, now in a white fringe blazer and a brownish hat with a feather, is lowered halfway. Gaga then goes down to the platform to tell the audience a story about her late aunt, Joanne Germanotta, before sitting down on a stool, guitar in-hand to perform the album title track.

The final segment begins with "Bad Romance", with Gaga and her dancers all decked in white, followed by "The Cure" with full choreography. She takes a bow and leaves the stage, only to return a few minutes later for the encore, wearing a long silver sparkling jacket paired with the signature pink hat. "Million Reasons" is sung on piano, with the singer standing atop it, and the show ends with Gaga disappearing under the stage, while leaving the pink hat behind on the piano stool.

Commercial performance

Ticket sales 
According to Live Nation, all the arena dates of the tour had general admission as well as reserved seat tickets listed. Special privileges were provided to Citi bank card holders, who had the opportunity to utilize the pre-sale in cities like Los Angeles and Philadelphia, although there was a limit of 8 tickets per transaction for any buyer. For every ticket sold for the United States shows, Live Nation also announced that US$1 would be given to Gaga's Born This Way Foundation.

The company announced that there were high demands for tickets across North America and Europe, when tickets went on for sale on February 13, 2017. All the dates for the North American leg were instantly sold out leading to secondary dates being added in cities like Las Vegas, Inglewood, Toronto and Philadelphia as well as at New York City's Citi Field and Boston's Fenway Park. There were further sold-out shows reported for the tour dates in Tacoma, Omaha, Vancouver, Edmonton, San Francisco, Chicago and Montreal among others. Similar demand was observed in Europe where tickets had gone on sale three days earlier, leading to sell-outs. Barcelona, Birmingham, London and Paris were sold out immediately with Live Nation promptly announcing secondary dates. A press release from the company alerted that minimum tickets were available for the dates with the high demand.

Boxscore 
Billboard revealed the first North American boxscores for the tour in August 2017. Total gross was at $8.7 million, with 78,530 tickets sold from four sold-out shows. The shows at Inglewood's The Forum provided both the highest gross and ticket sales of the shows reported, grossing $3.6 million with an attendance of 28,567. The first American show, at Tacoma Dome in Tacoma, produced the top sales and attendance among the arenas that hosted only one show, grossing $2.1 million and an attendance of 19,296 — a 36% increase both in gross and ticket sales compared to her previous Born This Way Ball tour show at the arena. Bob Allen from the magazine noted a 72% increase for the most expensive tickets at the venue in comparison to Born This Way Ball — from $175 to $251. She added another $11.9 million to the gross, and was the top boxscore artist in the next published totals in Billboard, with 103,162 tickets sold.

As the first leg came to end, Billboard reported the totals as $52 million, with over 440,000 tickets sold and a total of 20 sold-out concerts. The stadium shows averaged at 36,500 per concert, while in the arenas the average was 15,800. The latter was more than the average of her previous tours: ArtRave: The Artpop Ball (2014) had an average of 12,300 attendance while Born This Way Ball (2012–2013) raked in at 12,400 during its 10-month run. Pollstar revealed that the North American leg grossed $85.7 million in total, with 737,155 tickets sold. It was ranked at number 14 on Pollstars year end tabulation of the Top 100 Worldwide Tours of 2017, with $2.45 million average gross from over 35 reported dates. At the 2018 Ticketmaster Awards, it won the inaugural Touring Milestone Award for having sold more than 500,000 tickets. The tour ultimately grossed $95 million from 842,000 tickets sold.

Critical reception

North America 

Tom Murray from the Edmonton Journal was very positive in his review, saying that "a big, over-the-top assault on the senses, Gaga's Joanne World Tour is as impressive as an arena show gets, with a dramatic arc that hinges as much on the singer's charisma and vocal skills as it does any of the special effects." Alex Stedman for Variety stated: "Lady Gaga can do more than your average pop star. ... Though there's much to be said about Gaga's unfaltering vocals and high-energy showmanship, it's also worth noting one of the most impressive parts of the show: the set." In another positive review, Las Vegas Weeklys Josh Bell wrote: "Even as Lady Gaga's studio albums have become more scattered and uneven, she remains a fantastic live act, distilling the best of her music, her fashion sense, her vocal skills and her charismatic personality into a two-hour stage spectacle. ... Gaga herself remained the most mesmerizing part of an impressively crafted show." Reviewing the first show at Fenway Park, Brett Milano from Boston Herald praised Gaga's voice: "She's a remarkable singer, equally at home with blue-eyed soul, hard-edged dance tunes and torchy cabaret numbers. ... There wasn't a bit of evident lip-synching during last night's show and for mainstream pop artists at superstar level, that's a pretty big exception to the rule. The show suggested that her career may be moving into a less flashy, more intimate phase — but last night she brought it all, the cheap thrills and the underlying heart."

Jon Caramanica from The New York Times felt that the first part of the show was "disjointed, shifting styles and attitudes seemingly at random", but Gaga later "struck a rhythm". He further complimented the piano sessions, writing that "Gaga was at home" with the instrument. Selena Fragassi from the Chicago Sun-Times complimented the set design, the costumes, and Gaga's "nearly pitch-perfect" vocals, saying that the show is "just another testament to Gaga's star power". However, she was critical of Gaga's dancing abilities, saying that "the singer, though, was a shadow of her former dancing self, relying on years-old choreography and struggling to keep her balance on 'Bad Romance'." Similarly, Mikael Wood from the Los Angeles Times believed that the ballads were the concert's highlight, adding that "she's begun to tire of carefully synchronizing all those moving parts. In busy old hits like 'LoveGame' and 'Telephone', Lady Gaga put across little visible excitement". Richard Burnett wrote a positive review for the Montreal Gazette, saying that "what Gaga lacked in overall musical momentum was more than made up for by her eye-popping multiplatform main stage" with its special effects. Writing for The Detroit News, Adam Graham called Gaga "dynamite throughout the night" and praised her connection with the audience, while criticizing the overlong costume changes "as her band was forced to fill in the gaps with extended vamping".

Europe 
Alexis Petridis from The Guardian rated the show 5 stars out of five, and singled out Gaga's performance during the acoustic sections and her connection with the audience as highlights. He further added that although the show cannot be called "understated", compared to Gaga's older concert tours, "the weirdness that was once her calling card has been considerably scaled back". Alice Vincent from The Telegraph also noted that the Joanne Tour is "a more minimalist affair", but in her opinion "Gaga's appeal" is "not gimmicks or dramatic reinventions, but that she stays the same beneath them all". Jonathan Dean of The Times opined that the "show is a bit sombre, with heavy-handed videos and between-song chat about her mother and father crying, but this isn't for people who wince at sentimentality. It is for the fanatics who treat Gaga as family.'

Broadcast 
On November 19, 2017, Gaga performed "The Cure" live for the American Music Awards, from the tour stop at Capital One Arena in Washington, D.C. This was the first televised performance of the song, and Gaga's second consecutive year performing at the American Music Awards. The same day prior to performing "LoveGame", the show was put on hold to broadcast a live screening of the American Music Awards presentation for Best Pop/Rock Female Artist which Gaga won. The award was presented by three fans and her acceptance speech was broadcast live from the tour.

Set list 
This set list is from the August 1, 2017, concert in Vancouver. It is not intended to represent all concerts for the tour.

"Diamond Heart" 
"A-Yo"
"Poker Face"
"Perfect Illusion"
"John Wayne"
"Scheiße"
"Alejandro"
"Just Dance"
"LoveGame"
"Telephone"
"Applause"
"Come to Mama"
"The Edge of Glory"
"Born This Way"
"Bloody Mary"
"Dancin' in Circles"
"Paparazzi"
"Angel Down"
"Joanne"
"Bad Romance"
"The Cure"
Encore
"Million Reasons"

Shows

Cancelled shows

Notes

References

External links 

 Joanne World Tour on Lady Gaga Official Website

2017 concert tours
2018 concert tours
Lady Gaga concert tours
Concert tours of North America
Concert tours of Europe
Concert tours of the United States
Concert tours of Canada
Concert tours of Spain
Concert tours of Italy
Concert tours of the Netherlands
Concert tours of Belgium
Concert tours of Germany
Concert tours of the United Kingdom